Hangatiki railway station was a flag station on the North Island Main Trunk in New Zealand.

In 1915 Hangatiki was described as a small township with a post and telegraph office, where passengers for "the famous Waitomo and Ruakuri caves alight". The fare was 2/6 each way (about $18 in 2015 money).

History 
Coates & Metcalfe were the contractors for the  extension of this section of the NIMT, from Ōtorohanga to Te Kuiti. The station area had been levelled by May 1886. Until August 1887, the contractors provided goods trains. By October 1887 goods trains ran on Mondays and Fridays. New Zealand Railways Department took over from the contractors, adding a passenger service was added on those days from 2 December 1887. By 1896 there was a shelter shed, platform, cart approach,  by  goods shed and a passing loop for 35 wagons. In 1901 there was a petition for cattle yards and by 1911 there were cattle and sheep yards. A tablet porter started in 1912. A note in 1963 said the station was built in 1888 and last painted in 1953, but in 1980 the station building was noted as a concrete block and the loop as taking 75 wagons. On 31 January 1982 Hangatiki closed to all traffic except in wagon lots.

References

External links 
 Auckland Weekly News photos sheep ready for loading 27 MAY 1909 p6 (AWNS-19090527-6-1) and rear of station during a flood 29 July 1915 p43 (AWNS-19150729-43-3)

Defunct railway stations in New Zealand
Rail transport in Waikato
Buildings and structures in Waikato